The Wisconsin State Curling Association (WSCA) is a regional association of the United States Curling Association (USCA). Founded in 1964, the WSCA has 28 member curling clubs across Wisconsin, facilitating communication between the clubs and the national USCA as well as organizing various annual state curling championships.

History
The original Wisconsin Curling Association was founded in 1908 with L.J. Tucker from Pardeeville as the first president. Annual bonspiels were held throughout much of the first half of the 1900s. In 1945 the Portage Curling Club, home of the Wisconsin Curling Association, burned down. Later that year the Midwest Curling Association was created to organize clubs across  Nebraska, Ohio, Minnesota, Wisconsin, Illinois, Michigan, and North Dakota. The Midwest Curling Association disbanded in 1964 and later that year the modern incarnation Wisconsin State Curling Association was founded to represent the clubs within that state. Representatives from 27 curling clubs were at the meeting where the association was founded.

Member clubs

The association has 28 member clubs.

References

External links
 Wisconsin State Curling Association
 United States Curling Association

Curling governing bodies in the United States
Curling in Wisconsin
1964 establishments in Wisconsin